The family Threskiornithidae includes 36 species of large wading birds. The family has been traditionally classified into two subfamilies, the ibises and the spoonbills; however recent genetic studies have cast doubt on this arrangement, and have found the spoonbills to be nested within the Old World ibises, and the New World ibises as an early offshoot.

Taxonomy
The family Threskiornithidae was formerly known as Plataleidae. The spoonbills and ibises were once thought to be related to other groups of long-legged wading birds in the order Ciconiiformes. A recent study found that they are members of the order Pelecaniformes. In response to these findings, the International Ornithological Congress (IOC) recently reclassified Threskiornithidae and their sister taxa Ardeidae under the order Pelecaniformes instead of the previous order of Ciconiiformes.  Whether the two subfamilies are reciprocally monophyletic is an open question. The South American Checklist Committee's entry for the Threskiornithidae includes the following comment "Two subfamilies are traditionally (e.g., Matheu & del Hoyo 1992) recognized: Threskiornithinae for ibises and Plataleinae for spoonbills; because the main distinction has to do with bill shape, additional information, especially genetic, is required to recognize a major, deep split in the family."

A study of mitochondrial DNA of the spoonbills plus the sacred and scarlet ibises found that the spoonbills formed a clade with old world genus Threskiornis, with Nipponia nippon and Eudocimus as progressively earlier offshoots and more distant relatives, and hence casts doubt on the arrangement of the family into ibis and spoonbill subfamilies. Subsequent studies have supported these findings, the spoonbills forming a monophyletic clade within the "widespread" clade of ibises, including Plegadis and Threskiornis, while the "new World Endemic" clade is formed by the genera restricted to the Americas such as Eudocimus and Theristicus.

Description
Members of the family have long, broad wings with 11 primary feathers and about 20 secondaries. They are strong fliers and, rather surprisingly, given their size and weight, very capable soarers. The body tends to be elongated, the neck more so, with rather long legs. The bill is also long, decurved in the case of the ibises, straight and distinctively flattened in the spoonbills.

Distribution and ecology
They are distributed almost worldwide, being found near almost any area of standing or slow-flowing fresh or brackish water. Ibises are also found in drier areas, including landfills.

The Llanos are notable in that these wetland plains support seven species of ibis in the one region.

All ibises are diurnal; spending the day feeding on a wide range of invertebrates and small vertebrates: ibises by probing in soft earth or mud, spoonbills by swinging the bill from side to side in shallow water. At night, they roost in trees near water. They are gregarious, feeding, roosting, and flying together, often in formation.

Nesting is colonial in ibises, more often in small groups or singly in spoonbills, nearly always in trees overhanging water, but sometimes on islands or small islands in swamps. Generally, the female builds a large structure out of reeds and sticks brought by the male. Typical clutch size is two to five; hatching is asynchronic. Both sexes incubate in shifts, and after hatching feed the young by partial regurgitation. Two or three weeks after hatching, the young no longer need to be brooded continuously and may leave the nest, often forming creches but returning to be fed by the parents.

Species

FAMILY: THRESKIORNITHIDAE
 Subfamily: Threskiornithinae – Ibises
 Genus Threskiornis
 African sacred ibis,  Threskiornis aethiopicus
 Malagasy sacred ibis, Threskiornis bernieri
 †Reunion ibis, Threskiornis solitarius (extinct)
 Black-headed ibis,  Threskiornis melanocephalus
 Australian white ibis,  Threskiornis molucca
 Solomons white ibis,  Threskiornis molucca pygmaeus
 Straw-necked ibis,  Threskiornis spinicollis
 Genus Pseudibis
 Red-naped ibis,  Pseudibis papillosa
 White-shouldered ibis,  Pseudibis davisoni
 Genus Thaumatibis
 Giant ibis,  Thaumatibis gigantea
 Genus Geronticus
 Northern bald ibis,  Geronticus eremita
 Southern bald ibis,  Geronticus calvus
 Genus Nipponia
 Crested ibis,  Nipponia nippon 
 Genus Bostrychia
 Olive ibis,  Bostrychia olivacea
 São Tomé ibis, Bostrychia bocagei
 Spot-breasted ibis,  Bostrychia rara
 Hadada ibis,  Bostrychia hagedash
 Wattled ibis,  Bostrychia carunculata
 Genus Theristicus
 Plumbeous ibis,  Theristicus caerulescens
 Buff-necked ibis,  Theristicus caudatus
 Black-faced ibis,  Theristicus melanopis
 Genus Cercibis
 Sharp-tailed ibis,  Cercibis oxycerca
 Genus Mesembrinibis
 Green ibis,  Mesembrinibis cayennensis
 Genus Phimosus
 Bare-faced ibis,  Phimosus infuscatus
 Genus Eudocimus
 American white ibis,  Eudocimus albus
 Scarlet ibis,  Eudocimus ruber
 Genus Plegadis
 Glossy ibis,  Plegadis falcinellus
 White-faced ibis,  Plegadis chihi
 Puna ibis,  Plegadis ridgwayi
 Genus Lophotibis
 Madagascar ibis,  Lophotibis cristata
 Subfamily: Plataleinae – Spoonbills
 Genus Platalea
 Eurasian spoonbill, Platalea leucorodia
 Black-faced spoonbill, Platalea minor
 African spoonbill, Platalea alba
 Royal spoonbill, Platalea regia
 Yellow-billed spoonbill, Platalea flavipes
 Roseate spoonbill, Platalea ajaja

References

External links

Threskiornithidae videos on the Internet Bird Collection

 
Bird families
Extant Ypresian first appearances
Taxa named by Charles Wallace Richmond